Danelo is a surname. Notable people with the surname include:

David J. Danelo, American author and lecturer
Joe Danelo (born 1953), American football player
Mario Danelo (1985–2007), American football player, son of Joe

See also
Danell
Danilo